The Judiciary of Albania interprets and applies the law of Albania. Albania's judicial system is a civil law system divided between courts with regular civil and criminal jurisdiction and administrative courts. Albanian law is codified and based on the French law. It is governed by the High Council of Justice (Këshilli i Lartë i Drejtësisë), and its management is aided by the office of the President of Albania, the Ministry of Justice, and the various courts chairpersons.

The judiciary is defined under the Constitution (Kushtetuta) and Law with a hierarchical structure, with the Constitutional Court (Gjykata Kushtetuese) and the Supreme Court (Gjykata e Lartë) at the apex. The District Courts (Gjykatat e Rrethit Gjyqësor) are the primary trial courts, and the Courts of Appeal (Gjykatat e Apelit) are the primary appellate courts.

The judiciary faces many problems and a widespread lack of confidence but is making progress in recent times. There have been serious violations of the accepted separation of powers doctrine, systematic attempts to undermine trials, problems with access to justice, problems with court infrastructure and financial support, and corruption.  But the 2016 Judicial System Reform aims to reform the system and bring upon a fairer and more efficient administration, a strengthening of the rule of law, the vetting and cleansing of the system of corrupt judges, etc.

Hierarchy 

Articles 135 - 145 of the Constitution of the Albanian Republic provide the basic framework for the organization of the Courts System. These provisions, coupled with applicable laws have given rise to the following system:

First Instance Courts

 District Courts , which have initial jurisdiction for both criminal (excluding serious crimes) and civil (excluding administrative disputes) cases. Their territorial jurisdiction extends to their respective Districts.
 Court of First Instance for Serious Crimes, deals with Serious Crimes and has territorial jurisdiction over the entire territory of the Republic of Albania.
 Administrative Court of First Instance, there are 6 Courts dealing with administrative law disputes, each responsible for their respective District.

 Intermediate Courts
 
 Courts of Appeal, which can review the decisions of lower courts for both criminal (excluding serious crimes) and civil (excluding administrative disputes) cases. Their territorial jurisdiction extends to given areas as defined by the President of Albania.
 Court of Appeals for Serious Crimes, which hears appeals for Serious Crimes and has territorial jurisdiction over the entire territory of the Republic of Albania.
 Administrative Court of Appeals, which hears appeals for administrative law disputes and has territorial jurisdiction over the entire territory of the Republic of Albania.

Highest Courts

Supreme Court of Albania, which hears appeals through the Civil Chamber, Penal Chamber and Administrative Chamber.  In cases of great complexity or when giving a unifying decision for all lower courts to follow, the Supreme Court Judges hold court as part of a Unified Chamber.
Constitutional Court of Albania, interprets the Constitution and hears cases concerning alleged abuses of Human Rights.

See also 
 Politics of Albania
 Prosecutor General (Albania)
 SPAK
 EURALIUS
 Corruption

References